Barry Charles Mazur (born December 19, 1937) is an American mathematician and the Gerhard Gade University Professor at Harvard University. His contributions to mathematics include his contributions to Wiles's proof of Fermat's Last Theorem in number theory, Mazur's torsion theorem in arithmetic geometry, the Mazur swindle in geometric topology, and the Mazur manifold in differential topology.

Life

Born in New York City, Mazur attended the Bronx High School of Science and MIT, although he did not graduate from the latter on account of failing a then-present ROTC requirement. He was nonetheless accepted for graduate studies at Princeton University, from where he received his PhD in mathematics in 1959 after completing a doctoral dissertation titled "On embeddings of spheres." He then became a Junior Fellow at Harvard University from 1961 to 1964. He is the Gerhard Gade University Professor and a Senior Fellow at Harvard. He is the brother of Joseph Mazur and the father of Alexander J. Mazur.

Work

His early work was in geometric topology. In an elementary fashion, he proved the generalized Schoenflies conjecture (his complete proof required an additional result by Marston Morse), around the same time as Morton Brown.  Both Brown and Mazur received the Veblen Prize for this achievement.  He also discovered the Mazur manifold and the Mazur swindle.

His observations in the 1960s on analogies between primes and knots were taken up by others in the 1990s giving rise to the field of arithmetic topology.

Coming under the influence of Alexander Grothendieck's approach to algebraic geometry, he moved into areas of diophantine geometry. Mazur's torsion theorem, which gives a complete list of the possible torsion subgroups of elliptic curves over the rational numbers, is a deep and important result in the arithmetic of elliptic curves.  Mazur's first proof of this theorem depended upon a complete analysis of the rational points on certain modular curves.  This proof was carried in his seminal paper "Modular curves and the Eisenstein ideal".
The ideas of this paper and Mazur's notion of Galois deformations, were among the key ingredients in Wiles's proof of Fermat's Last Theorem. Mazur and Wiles had earlier worked together on the main conjecture of Iwasawa theory.

In an expository paper, Number Theory as Gadfly, Mazur describes number theory as a field which

He expanded his thoughts in the 2003 book Imagining Numbers and Circles Disturbed, a collection of essays on mathematics and narrative that he edited with writer Apostolos Doxiadis.

Awards and honors
Mazur was elected to the American Academy of Arts and Sciences in 1978. In 1982 he was elected a member of the National Academy of Sciences. Mazur was elected to the American Philosophical Society in 2001, and in 2012 he became a fellow of the American Mathematical Society.

Mazur has received the Veblen Prize in geometry (1966), the Cole Prize in number theory (1982), the Chauvenet Prize for exposition (1994), and the Steele Prize for seminal contribution to research (2000) from the American Mathematical Society. In early 2013, he was presented with one of the 2011 National Medals of Science by President Barack Obama. In 2022, he was awarded the Chern Medal for outstanding lifelong achievement in mathematics.

Publications

Books

See also
Eigencurve
Eisenstein ideal
Iwasawa theory
Microbundle
Tate vector space

References

External links

 Homepage of Barry Mazur
 
 Video of Mazur talking about his work, from the National Science & Technology Medals Foundation
 Barry Mazur on MathSciNet

1937 births
Members of the United States National Academy of Sciences
Living people
20th-century American mathematicians
21st-century American mathematicians
Mathematics popularizers
Number theorists
20th-century American Jews
The Bronx High School of Science alumni
Princeton University alumni
Harvard University faculty
National Medal of Science laureates
Institute for Advanced Study visiting scholars
Fellows of the American Mathematical Society
Topologists
Mathematicians from New York (state)
21st-century American Jews
Members of the American Philosophical Society